Paramonga District is one of five districts of the province Barranca in Peru.

It is, in the history of Peru, the first agroindustrial district due to the existence of factories dedicated to the production of sugarcane derivatives.

References